First Presbyterian Church is a historic church at 110 Church Avenue in Oshkosh, Wisconsin, United States.

It was designed by Walter A. Holbrook of Milwaukee and built in 1893. The style is Richardsonian-Romanesque, with a complex, irregular profusion of turrets, chimneys and towers resembling Richardson's early libraries, meant to suggest it had been gradually added onto over many years. The exterior is red brick with stone trim. The interior normally seated 500 people, but could be expanded by raising doors to other rooms.  A manse and office were added in 1905.

The building was added to the National Register of Historic Places in 1974, based on its architecture.

References

External links

Churches in Winnebago County, Wisconsin
Presbyterian churches in Wisconsin
Churches on the National Register of Historic Places in Wisconsin
Churches completed in 1893
Romanesque Revival church buildings in Wisconsin
National Register of Historic Places in Winnebago County, Wisconsin